Sharieh-ye Omm-e Teman (also Romanized as Sharīʿeh-ye Omm-e Teman) is a village in Gharb-e Karun Rural District, in the Central District of Khorramshahr County, Khuzestan Province, Iran. At the 2006 census, its population was 182, in 29 families.

References 

Populated places in Khorramshahr County